Brachycythara dasa, is an extinct species of sea snail, a marine gastropod mollusk in the family Mangeliidae.

Description
The length of the shell attains 4.6 mm, its diameter 2.2 mm.

Distribution
This extinct marine species can be found in Early Miocene strata of the Alum Bluff Formation of Florida, USA.

References

Further reading

External links
 Worldwide Mollusk Species Data Base: Brachycythara dasa

dasa